Newton Stewart Hospital is a health facility in Newton Stewart, Dumfries and Galloway, Scotland. It is managed by NHS Dumfries and Galloway.

History 
The facility has its origins in an infectious diseases hospital which opened in 1904. It joined the National Health Service in 1948. An extension was created by demolishing an adjacent smallpox hospital in the 1970s. The trust decided to limit the number of bed spaces to 14 due to staff shortages in 2018.

References

Further reading

Hospitals in Dumfries and Galloway
NHS Scotland hospitals
1904 establishments in Scotland
Hospitals established in 1904
Hospital buildings completed in 1904
Newton Stewart